is a Japanese filmmaker.

Filmography

Director 
1979 Rusty Empty Can (錆びた缶空, Sabita Kankara)
1981 Pig-Chicken Suicide (豚鶏心中, Tonkeishinju)
1988 The Noisy Requiem (追悼のざわめき, Tsuitō no Zawameki)
2007 Where Are We Going? (どこに行くの, Doko ni Iku no?)

Editor 
1980 Crazy Thunder Road (狂い咲きサンダーロード, Kuruizaki Sandā Rōdo) (co-editor with Sōgo Ishii)

References

External links 

Interview (2008) at Midnight Eye
Interview (2008) at The Japan Times

1956 births
Living people
Japanese film directors
People from Hyōgo Prefecture